The Cumbria Women's cricket team is the women's representative cricket team for the English ceremonial county of Cumbria. They play their home games at various grounds across the county. In 2019, they played in Division 3 of the final season of the Women's County Championship, and have since competed in the Women's Twenty20 Cup. Cumbria have links with Lancashire, with some players playing for both sides, and they are partnered with the regional side North West Thunder.

History
Cumbria Women's first recorded match was against Scotland Women in 2000, which they lost by 10 wickets. The following year, Cumbria joined the Emerging Counties competition, which acted as a feeder competition for the Women's County Championship, in which they competed for three seasons before joining its successor, the County Challenge Cup. Since then, in the Challenge Cup and when they joined the County Championship proper in 2008, Cumbria Women have remained in the bottom tier of competition.  They also joined the Women's Twenty20 Cup for its inaugural year in 2009, and again have been consistently in the lowest division.  They achieved one of their best finishes in 2019, finishing 2nd in Division 3C with 3 victories. In 2021, they competed in the North Group of the Twenty20 Cup, finishing bottom with no victories. They again finished bottom of their group in the 2022 Women's Twenty20 Cup.

Players

Current squad
Based on appearances in the 2022 season.

Notable players
Players who have played for Cumbria and played internationally are listed below, in order of first international appearance (given in brackets):

 Hannah Rainey (2018)

Seasons

Women's County Championship

Women's Twenty20 Cup

See also
 Cumbria County Cricket Club
 North West Thunder

References

Cricket in Cumbria
Women's cricket teams in England